Tuxpan is a municipality and city in Veracruz, Mexico.

Tuxpan may also refer to other places in Mexico:
 Tuxpan, Jalisco
 Tuxpan, Michoacán
 Tuxpan, Nayarit

Municipalities
 Tuxpan Municipality, Jalisco
 Tuxpan Municipality, Michoacán
 Tuxpan Municipality, Nayarit
 Tuxpan Municipality, Veracruz

Rivers
 Tuxpan River (Jalisco)
 Tuxpan River (Veracruz), emptying into the Gulf of Mexico
 Tuxpan River, another river in Veracruz, tributary of the Papaloapan River near Tlacotalpan

Others
 Roman Catholic Diocese of Tuxpan

See also
 Tuxpan de Bolaños